F38 or F-38 may refer to:
 F38 (classification), a disability sport classification
 F-38 (Michigan county highway)
 , a Leander-class frigate of the Royal Navy